Four ships of the Royal Navy have borne the name HMS Powerful.

Ships
 was a 74-gun third rate launched in 1783 and broken up in 1812.
 was an 84-gun second rate launched in 1826. She was used as a target from 1860 and was broken up by 1864.
 was a  protected cruiser launched in 1895. She became a training ship in 1919 and was renamed HMS Impregnable, and was sold in 1929.
 was a  laid down in 1943 and launched in 1945. Work was suspended in 1946, but resumed in 1952 and sold to Canada. She was relaunched in 1956 and renamed . She was broken up in 1971.

Establishments
 HMS Powerful II was a training establishment at Devonport aboard  between 1913 and 1919.
 HMS Powerful III was training establishment at Devonport aboard  between 1913 and 1919.

Royal Navy ship names